Chris Pavone (born 1968) is an American author of international thrillers. His first novel, The Expats, was a New York Times bestseller.

Background
Pavone attended Cornell University. Before writing his first novel, Pavone worked at a number of publishing houses as an editor. He lived briefly in Luxembourg with his family. He currently lives in New York City with his wife and his two children.

The Expats 
The Expats, Pavone's first novel, was a New York Times bestseller.  It was published in March 2012 by Crown. The Observer described the book as "expertly and intricately plotted, with a story spiralling into disaster and a satisfyingly huge amount of double crossing, [which] certainly doesn't feel like a first novel". The Expats won the 2013 Edgar Award for best first novel by an American author. It also won the 2013 Anthony Award for best first novel.

Publications 

The Expats (Crown, 2012)
The Accident (Crown, March 2014)
The Travelers (Crown, March 2016)
The Paris Diversion (Crown, May 2019)
Two Nights in Lisbon (MCD, 2022)

References

1968 births
Living people
21st-century American novelists
American male novelists
American mystery novelists
Edgar Award winners
Cornell University alumni
21st-century American male writers
Anthony Award winners